Isaiah Young (born March 30, 1998) is an American professional soccer player who plays as a forward for Rot-Weiss Essen.

Career
Young made his professional debut on the first matchday of the 2017–18 season in the 3. Liga, being substituted on in Werder Bremen II's 3–0 win against SpVgg Unterhaching.

He joined Belgian second-tier side Royale Union Saint-Gilloise on loan for the 2019–20 season.

On October 5, 2020, the last day of the 2020 summer transfer window, Young left Werder Bremen permanently moving to Regionalliga West club Rot-Weiss Essen.

References

1998 births
Living people
People from Berlin, New Jersey
Soccer players from New Jersey
Sportspeople from Camden County, New Jersey
American soccer players
Association football forwards
United States men's under-20 international soccer players
3. Liga players
Regionalliga players
Challenger Pro League players
SV Werder Bremen II players
Royale Union Saint-Gilloise players
Rot-Weiss Essen players
American expatriate soccer players
American expatriate soccer players in Germany
Expatriate footballers in Germany
American expatriate sportspeople in Belgium
Expatriate footballers in Belgium